Sue Donaldson (also known as Susan Cliffe; born 1962) is a Canadian writer and philosopher. She is a research fellow affiliated with the Department of Philosophy at Queen's University, where she is the co-founder of the Animals in Philosophy, Politics, Law and Ethics (APPLE) research cluster.

Biography
Donaldson was born in Ottawa in 1962, and has lived most of her life in Eastern Ontario. She currently lives in Kingston, Ontario with her husband, Will Kymlicka.

Writing

Donaldson is a vegan and a philosopher of animal rights. She published a vegan cookbook, Foods That Don't Bite Back, in 2003. She has also co-authored numerous articles in peer-reviewed academic journals on the topic of animal rights.

In 2004, she published a young adult novel, Threads of Deceit, under the name Susan Cliffe. This monograph is a historical fiction and mystery novel set in nineteenth century Upper Canada.

She published Zoopolis: A Political Theory of Animal Rights, co-written with Will Kymlicka, in 2011. In this book, as well as their other co-authored work on animal ethics, Donaldson and Kymlicka argue for a group-differentiated political conception of animal rights. Drawing upon citizenship theory, they argue that although all animals should be protected by the same fundamental rights, individual animals should have different rights (and different responsibilities) depending on their group membership. Animals who form a part of mixed human/animal society (domesticated animals) should be conceived of as citizens, while animals who are reliant upon the mixed society without being a part of it (liminal animals) should be conceived of as denizens. Wild animals, who live wholly or mostly separately from the mixed human/animal society, should be conceived of as sovereign over their own territory. Intervention to reduce wild animal suffering would accordingly be acceptable if compatible with respect for their sovereignty.

Awards
In 2013, she won the Canadian Philosophical Association's Book Prize, with Will Kymlicka, for their book Zoopolis.

Selected publications

Foods That Don't Bite Back: Vegan Cooking Made Simple. Vancouver: Whitecap Books, 2003.
Thread of Deceit (as Susan Cliffe). Toronto: Sumach Press, 2004.
Zoopolis: A Political Theory of Animal Rights (with Will Kymlicka). Oxford: Oxford University Press, 2011.
Chimpanzee Rights: The Philosophers' Brief, Routledge, 2018.

References

Further reading

Taylor, Angus (2014). "An Interview with Sue Donaldson and Will Kymlicka". Between the Species 17 (1).  
Wadiwel, Dinesh (2014). "Liberalism and Animal Rights: An Interview with Sue Donaldson". Sydney Environment Institute. Accessed 7 September 2016.

External links
Sue Donaldson at The Writers' Union of Canada

1962 births
Living people
Animal ethicists
Canadian animal rights scholars
Canadian food writers
Canadian philosophers
Canadian political philosophers
Canadian veganism activists
21st-century Canadian non-fiction writers
Canadian women non-fiction writers
21st-century Canadian novelists
Canadian women novelists
Canadian writers of young adult literature
Women writers of young adult literature
21st-century pseudonymous writers
Pseudonymous women writers
Vegan cookbook writers
Writers from Ottawa